Ronald Clyde Hall (17 April 1921 – 16 November 1994) was an Australian rules footballer who played with Melbourne in the Victorian Football League (VFL).

Career
Hall, a defender, was originally from Brighton, in the Victorian Football Association (VFA). He joined South Melbourne in the 1941 pre-season and was offered a place on their list, but opted to return to Brighton.

Following a stint in Sydney playing for St George, Hall joined Melbourne in 1944. Restricted by army commitments, he made only five appearances in his first two years with Melbourne. In the 1946 VFL season he played in the opening eight rounds, but didn't feature in the side for the rest of the year. He played four games in 1947, before being cleared back to Brighton mid-season, where he gained immediate selection at full-back.

In 1948 he was suspended for 12 weeks on a charge of kicking and as a result missed out playing in Brighton's only VFA premiership. At that year's club awards, Hall was named "Best Clubman" and he would remain at Brighton for several more seasons.

References

External links

1921 births
Australian rules footballers from Melbourne
Melbourne Football Club players
Brighton Football Club players
St George AFC players
1994 deaths
Australian Army personnel of World War II
People from Brighton, Victoria
Military personnel from Melbourne